Ali Hajimiri is an academic, entrepreneur, and inventor in various fields of engineering, including electrical engineering and biomedical engineering. He is the Bren Professor of Electrical Engineering and Medical Engineering at the California Institute of Technology (Caltech).

Education 
Hajimiri received the B.S. degree in electrical engineering from Sharif University of Technology and his M.S. and Ph.D. degrees in electrical engineering from Stanford University. He has also worked for Bell Laboratories, Philips Semiconductors, and Sun Microsystems. As a part of his Ph.D. thesis, he developed a time-varying phase noise model for electrical oscillators, also known as the Hajimiri phase noise model.

Career 
In 2002, together with his former students Ichiro Aoki and Scott Kee, he cofounded Axiom Microdevices Inc. based on their invention of the Distributed Active Transformer (DAT), which made it possible to integrate RF CMOS power amplifiers suitable for cellular phones in CMOS technology. Axiom shipped hundreds of millions of units  before it was acquired by Skyworks Solutions in 2009.

He and his students also demonstrated the world's first radar-on-a-chip in silicon technology in 2004, showing a 24-GHz 8-element phased array receiver and a 4-element phased array transmitter in CMOS. These were followed by a 77-GHz phased array transceiver (transmitter and receiver) with on chip antennas that established the highest level of integration in mm-wave frequency applications and was a complete radar-on-a-chip. They also developed a fully scalable phased array architecture in 2008, making it possible to realize very-large-scale phased arrays.

He and his team are also responsible for the development of an all-silicon THz imager system, where an integrated CMOS microchip was used in conjunction with a second silicon microchip to form an active THz imaging system, capable of seeing through opaque objects. They demonstrated various phased array transmitters around 0.3THz with beam steering using the distributed active radiator (DAR) architecture in 2011. Various applications of this system appear in security, communications, medical diagnostics, and the human-machine interface.

In 2013, he and some of his team members demonstrated a complete self-healing power amplifier, which through an integrated self-healing strategy, could recover from various kinds of degradation and damage including aging, local failure, and intentional laser blasts.

Between 2014 and 2018, his lab demonstrated several major advances in imaging, projection, and sensing technology on silicon photonic platforms. In 2014, they showed the first silicon nanophotonic optical phased array transmitter capable of dynamic and real-time image projection, therefore serving as a lensless projector. In 2015, he and his group constructed a 3D coherent camera via a silicon nanophotonic coherent imager (NCI) that performed direct 3D imaging at meter range with a 15-micron depth resolution. In 2016, they devised and implemented a one-dimensional (1D) integrated optical phased array receiver which could image a barcode directly from the surface of a chip, followed in 2017 by an integrated two-dimensional (2D) optical phased array receiver capable of imaging simple 2D patterns without a lens using a very thin optical synthetic aperture of a few microns, thereby demonstrating a lensless flat camera for the first time. In 2018, they demonstrated the world's first all-integrated optical gyroscope, whose principle of operation is based on the Sagnac effect.

He and his team have also developed systems and technologies for wireless power transfer at a distance. In 2017, he co-founded GuRu Wireless (formerly Auspion, Inc.), which commercializes wireless power transfer technology for consumers.

Awards and recognitions
 2019 Winner of Richard P. Feynman Prize for Excellence in Teaching, Caltech's most prestigious teaching award, 
 2015 Winner, Microwave Prize. 
 2013 Recognized as Top-10 contributors to the ISSCC in its 60-year history. 
 2004 Named to the world's top 35 innovators under 35 (TR35) at age 32. 
 2004 Caltech's undergraduate and graduate student council awards.
 2004 Best Paper Award, IEEE Journal of Solid-State Circuits
 2002 National Science Foundation CAREER Award
 1998 Jack Kilby Best Paper Award, International Solid-State Circuits Conference, 
 1990 Bronze Medal International Physics Olympiad
 1990 Gold Medal (Absolute Winner), National Physics Olympiad

Fellowships and academy membership
 Fellow, National Academy of Inventors (NAI).
 Fellow, IEEE
 Served as distinguished lecturer of IEEE Solid-State Society and Microwave Society.

Inventions and patents
He holds more than 130 issued U.S. patents.

Books 
Analog: Inexact Science, Vibrant Art, 2020
The Design of Low Noise Oscillators, co-authored with Thomas H. Lee, Springer, 1999,

References

External links 
Official lab website | Caltech.

21st-century American engineers
Sharif University of Technology alumni
Stanford University alumni
Iranian expatriate academics
American people of Iranian descent
California Institute of Technology faculty
Living people
Year of birth missing (living people)